Autumn Leaves is a 1980 album by Bill Evans with Eddie Gómez on bass and Marty Morell on drums. It was released by Lotus, an Italian record label.

Track listing

References

External links
 http://pianologist.com/transcription-sheet-music-score/bill-evans-autumn-leaves-transcription-of-solo/

1980 live albums
Bill Evans live albums